Iurii Illich Kostiuk (born 2 October 1977) is a Ukrainian biathlete, cross-country skier, and Paralympic Champion.

Career
He competed in biathlon and cross-country skiing at the 2006 Winter Paralympics in Turin, Italy. In cross-country skiing he took the gold medal in the men's 15 km, silver in the 5 km and bronze in the 10 km, sitski. In biathlon, he took the silver medal in the men's 7.5 km and placed 4th in the 12.5 km.

At the 2010 Winter Paralympics in Vancouver, Canada, he took one silver medal in biathlon in the men's 2.4 km pursuit, sitting, and one in cross-country skiing in the men's relay, open. In biathlon, he also competed in the 12.5 km individual, sitting where he placed 5th, and in cross-country skiing where he placed 4th in the men's 1 km sprint, 4th in the 10 km and 5th in the 15 km, sitting.

References

External links
 

1977 births
Living people
Sportspeople from Lutsk
Ukrainian male biathletes
Ukrainian male cross-country skiers
Paralympic biathletes of Ukraine
Paralympic cross-country skiers of Ukraine
Paralympic gold medalists for Ukraine
Paralympic silver medalists for Ukraine
Paralympic bronze medalists for Ukraine
Paralympic medalists in biathlon
Paralympic medalists in cross-country skiing
Biathletes at the 2006 Winter Paralympics
Cross-country skiers at the 2006 Winter Paralympics
Biathletes at the 2010 Winter Paralympics
Cross-country skiers at the 2010 Winter Paralympics
Medalists at the 2006 Winter Paralympics
Medalists at the 2010 Winter Paralympics
Sportspeople from Volyn Oblast